Fly Exam is the third studio album from JGivens. Humble Beast Records released the album on September 25, 2015.

Critical reception

Awarding the album four stars at Jesus Freak Hideout, Kevin Hoskins states, "J keeps it fully creative, but still manages to keep most tracks on point and they come out well." Randy "Mr. Hip Hop" Mason, giving the album an 88 percent for Jesus Wired, writes, "Fly Exam brilliantly begins prior to pressing play, as the cover art possesses a substantial part of the whole experience...Overall, Fly Exam is a well told story about the flight, and plight of humanity. It’s equally entertaining, as it is convicting. JGivens and Humble Beast once again raise the bar with this creative effort delivered in excellence." Rating the album four stars from Reel Gospel, Carlin Doyle says, "Overall, Fly Exam is a work of art. It is an intricately crafted album from start to finish, in production and content."

Track listing

Chart performance

References

2015 albums
JGivens albums